Upper Lybster is a scattered and crofting village, situated 2 miles north of Lybster, in eastern Caithness, Scottish Highlands and is in the Scottish council area of Highland.

Gallery

References

Populated places in Caithness